John Ottman (born July 6, 1964) is an American film composer and editor. He is best known for collaborating with director Bryan Singer, composing and/or editing many of his films, including Public Access (1993), The Usual Suspects (1995), Superman Returns (2006), Valkyrie (2008) and Jack the Giant Slayer (2013), as well as the X-Men film series. For his work on Singer's 2018 Queen biopic Bohemian Rhapsody, Ottman won the Academy Award for Best Film Editing.

Life and career
Ottman was born in San Diego, California. Growing up in San Jose, Ottman made many amateur films garnering local attention in the community. He attended De Anza College and then transferred to the School of Cinematic Arts of the University of Southern California, where he graduated in 1988. One of his first assignments was to provide original music for the computer game I Have No Mouth, and I Must Scream. In 2007, Ottman appeared in the documentary Finding Kraftland for his agent Richard Kraft.

He is best known for his multi-tasking as editor and composer for Bryan Singer's films, and on a few occasions, producer roles to boot. The Usual Suspects, Apt Pupil, X2, Superman Returns (including adapting themes originally composed by John Williams), Valkyrie, Jack the Giant Slayer, X-Men: Days of Future Past and X-Men: Apocalypse. Other notable films he worked on as composer are Snow White: A Tale of Terror, the 2005 remake of House of Wax, Kiss Kiss Bang Bang, Fantastic Four and its sequel Fantastic Four: Rise of the Silver Surfer, The Invasion, and Astro Boy.

He also directed (in addition to editing and scoring) the 2000 horror film Urban Legends: Final Cut. He won a BAFTA Award for Best Editing for The Usual Suspects, as well as two Saturn Awards for Best Music for The Usual Suspects and Superman Returns. In 2019, he was nominated for a BAFTA Award for Best Editing and won the ACE Eddie Award and the Academy Award his work on Bohemian Rhapsody, a film Ottman saw through on his own after both directors' departure (Bryan Singer being fired and Dexter Fletcher beginning pre-production on "Rocketman" shortly after finishing the shoot.) Ottman navigated the film's development in post and the tricky waters between film-maker and studio, working with producer Graham King and Dennis O'Sullivan. Upon Bohemian Rhapsody getting nominated for, and winning its Best Editing awards, a scene of the band outside a pub went viral online after a post by someone critical of the editing style. Ottman, aware of the clip, explained that for a test screening, a heightened pace for the first act was asked for by the studio. After the test, Ottman returned the scene to its original pace and design. Ottman regretted that he missed returning the scene outside the pub closer to his original version. The scene (directed by Fletcher) contained no master shot of the band at the table.

Filmography

Composer

Other credits

See also
 List of film director and composer collaborations
 List of film director and editor collaborations

References

External links
 
 John Ottman's Official Website
 John Ottman's Official Facebook Profile
 Interview with John Ottman (July 2006)
 Interviews with John Ottman at FilmMusicSite

1964 births
American film editors
American film score composers
Best Editing BAFTA Award winners
Best Film Editing Academy Award winners
Film directors from California
Gay men
Living people
American male film score composers
Musicians from San Diego
USC School of Cinematic Arts alumni
Varèse Sarabande Records artists
La-La Land Records artists